The following is a list of second moments of area of some shapes. The second moment of area, also known as area moment of inertia, is a geometrical property of an area which reflects how its points are distributed with respect to an arbitrary axis. The unit of dimension of the second moment of area is length to fourth power, L4, and should not be confused with the mass moment of inertia. If the piece is thin, however, the mass moment of inertia equals the area density times the area moment of inertia.

Second moments of area

Please note that for the second moment of area equations in the below table:  and

Parallel axis theorem 

The parallel axis theorem can be used to determine the second moment of area of a rigid body about any axis, given the body's second moment of area about a parallel axis through the body's centroid, the area of the cross section, and the perpendicular distance (d) between the axes.

See also

 List of moments of inertia
 List of centroids
 Second polar moment of area

References

Area moment of inertia
Area moments of inertia
Moment (physics)